8 male athletes from Nigeria competed at the 1996 Summer Paralympics in Atlanta, United States.

Background 
In many parts of Africa, people with physical and mental disabilities face widespread stigma.  Examples include beliefs that they acquired their disabilities because their parents were witches or they are wizards; there is often intense cultural pressure for people with physical disabilities to remain hidden and out of the public eye.  In many places, they are perceived to be monsters in need of healing.  This is the context to which Nigerian Paralympians engage both society and sport internally, in their own country.

Medals 
The Nigerian Paralympic delegation left the Games having won more medals than their Olympic counterparts. Adeoye Ajibola  would later go on to represent Nigeria in able-bodied competition.

Athletics 

Adeoye Ajibola won three medals in athletics.

Powerlifting 

Monday Emoghavwe, Abraham Obaretin, Johnson Sulola and Patrick Akutaekwe won a medal in powerlifting.

Table tennis

See also
Nigeria at the Paralympics
Nigeria at the 1996 Summer Olympics

References 

Nations at the 1996 Summer Paralympics
1996
Summer Paralympics